Andersons Creek is a creek in Warrandyte and Park Orchards, east of Melbourne, Victoria, Australia. It is a tributary of the Yarra River. For tens of thousands of years it was used as a food and tool source sustainably by the Wurundjeri people, Aboriginal Australians of the Kulin nation, who spoke variations of the Woiwurrung language group.

The creek begins in the hills north of Ringwood on the boundary of urban metropolitan Melbourne from where it flows for roughly 2–3 km through Park Orchards and around 4 km through Warrandyte, before emptying into the Yarra River. The creek is relatively uninhibited by weirs, dams or reservoirs and it floods often after heavy rain. It provides habitat for significant species, which include: platypus, rakali, koalas, powerful owls, rufous night herons, white-winged choughs and yellow-tailed black cockatoos.

Gold was first discovered in Victoria in Andersons Creek, near the present day Warrandyte State Park, and the township of Warrandyte was initially named after the creek. Gold can still be found in the creek, and panning is permitted in a small section of it near the state park.

Geography

Tributaries and surrounding geographic features include, upstream to downstream:

Unnamed Creek
Fourth Hill
Unnamed Creek
Beauty Gully
Harris Gully
Melbourne Hill
Yarra River

See also
Victorian gold rush
Warrandyte State Park
Warrandyte

External links
Photos of Andersons Creek

Melbourne Water catchment
Rivers of Greater Melbourne (region)
Tributaries of the Yarra River